Balgal Beach is a coastal suburb and a beach in the City of Townsville, Queensland, Australia. The town of Balgal is within the locality.

Geography

History 
Balgal Beach was originally part of the Armidale pastoral lease, settled in 1883 by John Lambert before later changing name to Rollingstone. The area of coastline to the north of Rollingstone was named Balgal Beach in 1947, when the first dwellings were constructed. The name "Balgal" was derived from an Aboriginal word meaning "stone."

The land in this area was predominantly used for farming and grazing, and remained rural until the mid-1980s when the allocation of 500 rural/residential blocks at the Mystic Sands Estate saw the population increase nearly twofold.

In the 2006 census, the population of Balgal Beach was 743, a 30.3% increase since the 1996 census.

Amenities 
Located a few kilometres north of the suburb of Rollingstone, Balgal Beach today is a popular destination for recreational activities such as boating, fishing and swimming. A boat ramp is located by the mouth of Rollingstone Creek, allowing for access to Palm Island and Orpheus Island National Park. Facilities at Balgal Beach include a patrolled stinger enclosure from November to May, the Mystic Sands Golf & Country Club, a general store/cafe, holiday units and designated camping areas.

References

Further reading

External links
 

Suburbs of Townsville